Direma Banasso (born 29 November 1985) is a Togolese middle-distance runner. She competed in the women's 800 metres at the 2000 Summer Olympics. She was the first woman to represent Togo at the Olympics.

References

External links
 

1985 births
Living people
Athletes (track and field) at the 2000 Summer Olympics
Togolese female middle-distance runners
Olympic athletes of Togo
Place of birth missing (living people)
21st-century Togolese people